{{DISPLAYTITLE:Magnesium L-threonate}}

Magnesium L-threonate is a magnesium salt of L-threonic acid having the formula Mg(C4H7O5)2.

One animal study reported that magnesium L-threonate administered to rats boosts their cognitive abilities. There have been no human studies or evidence of benefit to them.

References

Magnesium compounds
Dietary supplements